Le Pop is the debut studio album by Norwegian band Katzenjammer. It was released on September 29, 2008 by Propeller Recordings.

Reception

Critical reception

The album received generally favorable reviews. Adrien Begrand from PopMatters rated Le Pop eight out of ten stars and wrote that its "songs all play to [Katzenjammer's] strengths and, most importantly, are all instantly memorable." In an additional review for PopMatters, Mike Schiller called Le Pop a "great album." Furthermore, he wrote that the album would have the listener "singing along" since its songs are "engrossing and appealing". In a review for The Washington Post, Catherine P. Lewis wrote that the album "never lacks energy" and called it a "charmingly quirky collection of songs." She did, however, write that Katzenjammer's "exuberance [occasionally] teeters on the brink of unbridled chaos," citing the album's title track, which she said "sounds like a circus band gone rogue."

Le Pop was nominated for a Spellemannprisen award for Best Debut Album of the Year in 2008.

Chart performance
In Norway, Le Pop debuted at number nine on the VG-lista albums chart. It remained on the chart for three weeks. The album reached number eighty-six in the Netherlands in October 2009. The revised version of Le Pop reached number seventy-one and remained on the albums chart for two weeks in August 2010.

Track listing
Songs written and composed by Mats Rybø. All songs arranged by Katzenjammer.

Revised edition

Personnel
Credits adapted from Le Pop liner notes.

Anne Marit Bergheim – vocals, instruments
Silje Katrine Gotaas – cello
Hans Petter Gundersen – production
Mike Hartung – production, engineering, mastering
Solveig Heilo – vocals, instruments
Hundenklunke – background vocals
Turid Jørgensen – vocals, instruments
Gunnhild Mathea – violin
Odd Norstaoga – accordion
Gjertrud Økland – trumpet violin, violin
Hasse Rosbach – co-production, engineering assistant
Marianne Sveen – vocals, instruments
Jørgen Sandvik – sitar, banjo   
Kåre Chr. Vestrheim – production, engineering, instruments

Charts

Release history

References

2008 debut albums
Katzenjammer (band) albums